Luca Vanni (born 4 June 1985) is an Italian former professional tennis player. He competed mainly on the ATP Challenger Tour and ITF Futures, both in singles and doubles. He reached his highest ATP singles ranking, no. 100 on 11 May 2015, and his highest ATP doubles ranking, no. 204, on 9 July 2012.

Career
In 2014, he won seven ITF Futures tournaments, his best season to date.

In 2015, he reached his first ATP final in the Brasil Open, but lost to Pablo Cuevas. Later he qualified to the Madrid Masters and reached second round after defeating the world number 26 player Bernard Tomic.

ATP career finals

Singles: 1 (1 runner-up)

ATP Challenger and ITF Futures finals

Singles: 31 (21–10)

Doubles: 35 (15–20)

Performance timeline

Singles

References

External links

1985 births
Living people
Italian male tennis players